Montgomery Area Transit System is the operator of mass transportation in metropolitan Montgomery, Alabama. The organization was founded in 1974, after years of tumultuous relations between private bus operators and passengers.

Route list

See also
 Capital City Street Railway

References

Bus transportation in Alabama
Transportation in Montgomery, Alabama
Transit agencies in Alabama